The Hole Story is a 2011 documentary film and web documentary directed by Richard Desjardins and  about mining in Canada and its impact on the environment and workers' health. The film focuses primarily on the mining communities of the Northeastern Ontario and Abitibi-Témiscamingue regions, including Sudbury, Timmins, Cobalt, Rouyn-Noranda, Val-d'Or and Malartic.

The film includes interviews with figures such as federal Member of Parliament Charlie Angus, former Ontario MPP Elie Martel, former Sudbury mayor John Rodriguez, Rouyn-Noranda mayor Mario Provencher and former Val-d'Or mayor and Quebec MNA André Pelletier.

Produced by the National Film Board of Canada, the film had its world premiere in October 2011 at the Abitibi-Témiscamingue International Film Festival, before opening in Quebec theatres.

References

External links

The Hole Story Interactive, web documentary
Interview with Richard Desjardins, Morning North, CBCS-FM

2011 films
2011 documentary films
Quebec films
National Film Board of Canada documentaries
Documentary films about mining
Mining in Canada
National Film Board of Canada web documentaries
Canadian environmental websites
Films shot in Greater Sudbury
Films shot in Quebec
French-language Canadian films
2010s Canadian films